Triangle Derby I was the first annual round-robin six-woman tag team tournament event promoted by World Wonder Ring Stardom under the "Triangle Derby" branch. The event took place between January 3 and March 4, 2023, with limited attendance due in part to the ongoing COVID-19 pandemic at the time (until January 30). It also represented the first major event promoted by Stardom in 2023.

Tournament history
The Triangle Derby is a professional wrestling tournament held annually by Stardom. It is currently disputed as a round-robin tournament with teams of three wrestlers split into two pools. Contrary to most round-robin style tournaments, teams from the same pool don't face each other. Instead, each team faces all teams from the opposite pool. Matches are fought with a 15-minute time limit. A win is worth two points and a draw is worth one point. The top two teams from each pool will advance to a final single-elimination bracket, consisting of semifinals and finals.

Storylines
The tournament featured professional wrestling matches that resulted from scripted storylines, where wrestlers portrayed villains, heroes, or less distinguishable characters in the scripted events that built tension and culminated in a wrestling match or series of matches. The event's official press conference took place on December 16, 2022, and was broadcast live on Stardom's YouTube channel.

Participants
This is a list of participants including the champions during the event. The tournament featured fourteen teams formed by a total of forty-two wrestlers, divided into two distinctive blocks with the two highest placed teams of their respective blocks moving on to the semifinals.

*Noted underneath were the champions who held their titles at the time of the tournament.
{| class="wikitable sortable" align="left-center"  width:85%"
|-
!Wrestler
!Unit
!Notes
|-
|AZM
|Queen's Quest
|High Speed Champion
|-
|Ami Sourei
|God's Eye
|Future of Stardom Champion
|-
|Giulia
|Donna Del Mondo
|World of Stardom Champion
|-
|Hanan
|Stars
|
|-
|Haruka Umesaki
|Oedo Tai
|Freelancer
|-
|Hazuki
|Stars
|
|-
|Himeka
|Donna Del Mondo
|
|-style="background: gold"
|Hiragi Kurumi
|Prominence
|Artist of Stardom ChampionWinner
|-
|Koguma
|Stars
|
|-
|Lady C
|Queen's Quest
|
|-
|Mai Sakurai
|Donna Del Mondo
|
|-
|Maika
|Donna Del Mondo
|
|-
|Maika Ozaki
|Rebel X Enemy
|Freelancer
|-
|Mariah May
|Cosmic Angels/Club Venus
|One of the mystery trio participants
|-
|Maya Yukihi
|Rebel X Enemy
|Freelancer
|-
|Mayu Iwatani
|Stars
|
|-
|Mina Shirakawa
|Cosmic Angels
|One of the mystery trio participants
|-
|Mirai
|God's Eye
|
|-
|Momo Watanabe
|Oedo Tai
|
|-
|Nanae Takahashi
|Neo Stardom Army
|Freelancer
|-
|Natsuko Tora
|Oedo Tai
|
|-
|Natsupoi
|Cosmic Angels
|Goddess of Stardom Champion
|-
|Ram Kaicho
|Rebel X Enemy
|Freelancer
|-
|Rina Amikura
|Cosmic Angels/Color's
|Freelancer
|-style="background: gold"
|Risa Sera
|Prominence
|Artist of Stardom ChampionWinner
|-
|Ruaka
|Oedo Tai
|
|-
|Saki
|Cosmic Angels/Color's
|
|-
|Saki Kashima
|Oedo Tai
|
|-
|Saya Kamitani
|Queen's Quest
|Wonder of Stardom Champion
|-
|Saya Iida
|Stars
|
|-
|Starlight Kid
|Oedo Tai
|
|-style="background: gold"
|Suzu Suzuki
|Prominence
|Artist of Stardom ChampionWinner
|-
|Syuri
|God's Eye
|
|-
|Tam Nakano
|Cosmic Angels
|Goddess of Stardom Champion
|-
|Thekla
|Donna Del Mondo
|
|-
|Utami Hayashishita
|Queen's Quest
|
|-
|Waka Tsukiyama
|Cosmic Angels
|
|-
|Xia Brookside
||Cosmic Angels/Club Venus
|One of the mystery trio participants
|-
|Yuko Sakurai
|Cosmic Angels/Color's
|Freelancer
|-
|Yuna Mizumori
|Neo Stardom Army
|Freelancer
|-
|Yuu
|Neo Stardom Army
|Freelancer

Results

Finals

Event
The finals night took place on March 4, 2023. First three pre-show bouts were broadcast live on Stardom's YouTube channel. In the first of them, Rina picked up a victory over Queen's Quest's stablemates Miyu Amasaki and Hina in a three-way match. Next up, Utami Hayashishita and Lady C defeated Ram Kaicho and Maika Ozaki in tag team action. Next up, Maika, Thekla and Mai Sakurai picked up a victory over Mina Shirakawa, Mariah May and Waka Tsukiyama. The first main card bout saw Oedo Tai's Natsuko Tora, Momo Watanabe, Saki Kashima, Ruaka and Fukigen Death outmatching Stars members Mayu Iwatani, Koguma, Momo Kohgo, Hanan and Saya Iida in a Ten-woman tag team match. The fifth match of the night saw Syuri, Mirai and Ami Sourei outlasting Tam Nakano and Natsupoi and Saki in the Triangle Derby's first semifinal. Next up, Prominence (Suzu Suzuki, Risa Sera and Hiragi Kurumi) defeated Neo Stardom Army's Nanae Takahashi, Yuu and Yuna Mizumori in the other semifinal. After the bout concluded, Suzuki announced they put their Artist of Stardom Championship on the line against Syuri, Mirai and Sourei in the Triangle finals. In the seventh bout, Chihiro Hashimoto defeated Himeka by submission in one of the latter's last matches before retirement. After the bout concluded, Hashimoto finally challenged Syuri to a match at All Star Grand Queendom on April 23, 2023. In the eighth bout, Saya Kamitani secured the fifteenth consecutive defense of the Wonder of Stardom Championship against Hazuki. She nominated Mina Shirakawa as her next opponent for All Star Dream Queendom on April 23. Next up, AZM defeated Starlight Kid to secure the tenth consecutive defense of the High Speed Championship, setting a record at the time. In the semi main event, Giulia drew with Maya Yukihi for the World of Stardom Championship as a result of a double count-out after they brought the fight outside the ring. After the bout concluded, Giulia received a title challenge from Tam Nakano for All Star Grand Queendom on April 23, 2023.

In the main event, Suzu Suzuki, Risa Sera and Hiragi Kurumi defeated Syuri, Mirai and Ami Sourei to win the first edition of the Triangle Derby as well as retaining the Artist of Stardom Championship for the first time in that respective reign.

Results

Blocks
Stardom announced the official participants of the two blocks "Triangle Red" and "Triangle Blue" on December 16, 2022.

{| class="wikitable" style="text-align:center; margin: 1em auto 1em auto;" width="25%"
! 
! KaichoOzakiYukihi !! TsukiyamaSakuraiAmikura !! HazukiKogumaIida !! MaikaHimekaLady C !! SyuriMiraiSourei !! SuzukiSeraKurumi !! ToraWatanabeKashima
|-
!IwataniHananKohgo
|KaichoOzakiYukihi(10:30)
|IwataniHananKohgo(11:15)
|HazukiKogumaIida(9:11)
|MaikaHimekaLady C(11:34)
|SyuriMiraiSourei(11:17)
|SuzukiSeraKurumi(12:24)
|ToraWatanabeKashima(9:29)
|-
!KidUmesakiRuaka
|KidUmesakiRuaka(10:55)
|KidUmesakiRuaka(12:36)
|HazukiKogumaIida(9:03)
|KidUmesakiRuaka(9:12)
|SyuriMiraiSourei(12:06)
|SuzukiSeraKurumi(6:06)
|ToraWatanabeKashima(9:41)
|-
!GiuliaTheklaSakurai
|KaichoOzakiYukihi(14:38)
|GiuliaTheklaSakurai(9:05)
|GiuliaTheklaSakurai(12:37)
|GiuliaTheklaSakurai(11:50)
|SyuriMiraiSourei(13:47)
|SuzukiSeraKurumi(13:48)
|ToraWatanabeKashima(12:25)
|-
!HayashishitaKamitaniAZM
|HayashishitaKamitaniAZM(13:41)
|HayashishitaKamitaniAZM(11:39)
|HazukiKogumaIida(10:17)
|HayashishitaKamitaniAZM(12:10)
|Draw(15:00)
|HayashishitaKamitaniAZM(13:18)
|ToraWatanabeKashima(11:06)
|-
!NakanoNatsupoiSaki
|NakanoNatsupoiSaki(11:55)
|NakanoNatsupoiSaki(14:58)
|NakanoNatsupoiSaki(11:42)
|MaikaHimekaLady C(11:20)
|NakanoNatsupoiSaki(12:44)
|SuzukiSeraKurumi(13:25)
|NakanoNatsupoiSaki(9:29)
|-
!TakahashiYuuMizumori
|KaichoOzakiYukihi(13:11)
|TakahashiYuuMizumori(13:01)
|TakahashiYuuMizumori(8:50)
|TakahashiYuuMizumori(11:56)
|Draw(15:00)
|TakahashiYuuMizumori(13:21)
|TakahashiYuuMizumori(12:10)
|-
!ShirakawaBrooksideMay
|KaichoOzakiYukihi(13:39)
|ShirakawaBrooksideMay(9:02)
|ShirakawaBrooksideMay(10:03)
|ShirakawaBrooksideMay(12:33)
|SyuriMiraiSourei(13:36)
|SuzukiSeraKurumi(11:47)
|ShirakawaBrooksideMay(11:30)

See also
Artist of Stardom Championship
Goddesses of Stardom Tag League

Notes

References

External links
Page Stardom World

2023 in professional wrestling
2023 in Tokyo
World Wonder Ring Stardom shows
Women's professional wrestling shows
Professional wrestling in Tokyo
World Wonder Ring Stardom